Martín Castro (born 3 December 1969) is a Honduran former football player.

Club career
Martín Castro was born in Tela. After having short spells at Broncos UNAH and Deportes Progreseño, he was trespassed to Real España in 1991. With the club, Castro won the 1993-94 Honduran tournament, crowned with the team as campeonísimo. In 1995-96 championship, Castro scored an amazing goal to Olimpia in Tegucigalpa, during the hexagonal game of the tournament.

He ended his career on Independiente Villela in 1998.

Personal life
In 1999, Martín Castro went to United States, looking for work. Now he works as a cleaner of drywall structures and windows in Miami Beach, Florida. He married Claudia Dolmo and has two children: Ashley and Andrea.

References

1969 births
Living people
Honduran footballers
C.D. Broncos players
Real C.D. España players
Association football midfielders
People from Tela